William Walker Henson (7 December 1872 – 7 September 1922) was an English first-class cricketer active 1897–98 who played for Nottinghamshire. He was born in Lenton, Nottinghamshire; died in Dumfries.

References

1872 births
1922 deaths
English cricketers
Nottinghamshire cricketers
People from Lenton, Nottingham
Cricketers from Nottinghamshire